The Chavner Family House is a historic house in Gold Hill, Oregon.

Description and history
The house was designed by William Stuart and built in 1892. It was listed on the National Register of Historic Places on May 31, 1996.

See also
 Historic preservation
 Oregon country

References

External links
 
 

Houses on the National Register of Historic Places in Oregon
Queen Anne architecture in Oregon
Houses completed in 1892
Houses in Jackson County, Oregon
1892 establishments in Oregon
National Register of Historic Places in Jackson County, Oregon